Chick'nCone is a Lehigh Valley, Pennsylvania-based fast food chain, founded and owned by Jonathan Almanzar and Josh Lanier, specializing in a portable version of chicken and waffles.

Products 

The namesake food consists of breaded chicken strips served in a waffle cone. One of the main features that distinguishes it from traditional chicken and waffles is that it served without utensils such as forks or knives.

History 
Before establishing permanent retail locations in the Lehigh Valley, New York City, and in Kentucky, Chick'nCone was primarily a food truck and catering service. Sometimes considered a hybrid food item following their transition to permanent locations, Chick'nCones have been referred to as "hipster" food, "frankenfood" and "fork-free chicken and waffles" by various media outlets. In 2016, one of the founders declared "We wanna have 50 stores in 5 years. That's our goal."

See also 

 List of chicken restaurants

References

External links 
 

Chicken chains of the United States
Fast-food poultry restaurants
Carbon County, Pennsylvania
Lehigh County, Pennsylvania
Northampton County, Pennsylvania
Restaurants in Pennsylvania